Chris Salvaggione (born April 7, 1987) is an American soccer player who currently plays for Real Colorado Foxes in the USL Premier Development League.

Career

College and Amateur
Salvaggione attended Lewis-Palmer High School, helped his junior club side Colorado Rush to a US Club Soccer national championship, and began his college soccer career at Gardner–Webb University, transferring to the University of North Carolina at Charlotte as a junior in 2007. He helped his Gardner-Webb team win the 2006 Atlantic Sun Championship and reach the second round of the NCAA Tournament, while at UNC Charlotte he was named to the All-Atlantic 10 First Team and the NSCAA/Adidas All-Mid-Atlantic second team as a junior, and was the A-10 Offensive Player of the Year, an NSCAA Second Team All-American, and a Hermann Trophy semi-finalist as a senior.

During his college years Salvaggione also played extensively in the USL Premier Development League, featuring for Colorado Springs Blizzard, the DFW Tornados and Austin Aztex U23.

Professional
Salvaggione was drafted in the third round (38th overall) of the 2009 MLS SuperDraft by New England Revolution, but was not offered a contract by the Major League Soccer side.

After spending another year in the PDL in 2009, with the Real Colorado Foxes, playing reserve matches with the Colorado Rapids, and trialing unsuccessfully with Charleston Battery, Chivas USA and in Germany with FC Saarbrucken, FSV Frankfurt and KSV Klein-Karben, Salvaggione signed his first professional contract on February 11, 2010 for AC St. Louis. He made his professional debut on May 1, 2010 in a game against Crystal Palace Baltimore.

After the demise of AC St. Louis, Salvaggione signed with Charlotte Eagles of the third division USL Pro league on February 25, 2011.

References

External links
 AC St. Louis bio
 Gardner-Webb bio

1987 births
Living people
American soccer players
Charlotte 49ers men's soccer players
Colorado Springs Blizzard players
DFW Tornados players
Austin Aztex U23 players
Real Colorado Foxes players
AC St. Louis players
Charlotte Eagles players
USL League Two players
USSF Division 2 Professional League players
USL Championship players
New England Revolution draft picks
Soccer players from Colorado
People from Monument, Colorado
Association football forwards
Association football midfielders